Raphitoma arnoldi is a species of sea snail, a marine gastropod mollusk in the family Raphitomidae.

Description
The length of the shell varies between 5 mm and 14 mm.

The shell differs from Raphitoma papillosa (Pallary, 1904) by its taller shape, narrower whorls and by its more compact and regular reticulation.

Distribution
This species occurs in the Western and Central Mediterranean Sea.

References

 Gofas, S.; Le Renard, J.; Bouchet, P. (2001). Mollusca. in: Costello, M.J. et al. (eds), European Register of Marine Species: a check-list of the marine species in Europe and a bibliography of guides to their identification. Patrimoines Naturels. 50: 180-213

External links
 
 Pallary P. (1904-1906). Addition à la faune malacologique du Golfe de Gabès. Journal de Conchyliologie. 52: 212-248, pl. 7 [1904; 54: 77-124, pl. 4]
 naturamediterraneo vers. 0.1.9  15.11.2006
 Gastropods.com: Raphitoma arnoldi

arnoldi
Gastropods described in 1904